Mitchell A. Hildebrandt (born November 12, 1988) is an American former professional soccer goalkeeper. He is currently a coach for the Michigan Wolves youth academy.

Career

College and amateur
Hildebrandt played his entire college career at Oakland University. He redshirted in 2007. In his first season as a starter for Oakland in 2009, Hildebrandt finished with seven clean sheets and a 0.73 goals against average and was named to the All-Summit League first team. He had another solid year in 2010, finishing with a 1.24 goals against average and 0.77 save percentage and was again named to the All-Summit League first team. Hildebrandt went on to be named to the All-Summit League second team in his senior season in 2011 and finished his career with a total of 249 saves and 19 clean sheets.

During his time in college, Hildebrandt also spent time in the USL Premier Development League with Kalamazoo Outrage and Michigan Bucks.

Professional
On April 3, 2012, Hildebrandt signed a professional contract with Minnesota Stars FC (renamed Minnesota United FC in 2013) of the North American Soccer League. He made his professional debut on May 25, 2012, recording up a clean sheet in a 0–0 draw with the Atlanta Silverbacks.

In 2016, Hildebrandt moved to FC Cincinnati in the United Soccer League. Fans of Cincinnati would frequently chant "Mitch Says No" when Hildebrandt made a save. Hildebrandt agreed to a multi-year contract with Cincinnati following the 2016 season. He received national attention for his performance in the 2017 U.S. Open Cup semi-final against Chicago Fire, making three saves in the deciding penalty shootout.

Hildebrandt played for FC Cincinnati for two seasons before moving up to Major League Soccer, signing with Atlanta United FC on December 1, 2017. As of June 27, 2018, Hildebrandt has yet to come off the bench for Atlanta's first team, but he has made two appearances for Atlanta United 2 in the USL.

Hildebrandt was released by Atlanta at the end of its 2018 season.

On February 23, 2019, Hildebrandt announced via his social media accounts that he was retiring from professional soccer. He then joined Chicago Fire FC as a video scout.

In January 2020, Hildebrandt was appointed goalkeeping coach for Sporting Kansas City II of the USL Championship. Hildebrant came out of retirement to join the Sporting Kansas City II playing roster on September 16, 2020, becoming the first ever player-coach for the club.

Following the conclusion of the 2020 USL Championship season, Hildebrandt returned to Michigan to coach with the Michigan Wolves SC academy where he had played as a youth.

Honors

Individual
 USL All-League Team: 2016
 USL Goalkeeper of the Year: 2016

References

External links

 
 
 

1988 births
Living people
American soccer players
Sportspeople from Livonia, Michigan
Soccer players from Michigan
Oakland Golden Grizzlies men's soccer players
Kalamazoo Outrage players
Flint City Bucks players
Minnesota United FC (2010–2016) players
FC Cincinnati (2016–18) players
Atlanta United FC players
USL League Two players
North American Soccer League players
USL Championship players
Association football goalkeepers
Atlanta United 2 players
Sporting Kansas City II players
Association football goalkeeping coaches
Sporting Kansas City II coaches
USL Championship coaches
Chicago Fire FC non-playing staff